This article summarizes the events related to the world of poker in 1983.

Major Tournaments

1983 World Series of Poker 

Tom McEvoy wins the main tournament, becoming the first player to win after qualifying for a satellite.

1883 Super Bowl of Poker 

Hans Lund wins the main tournament.

Poker Hall of Fame 

Joe Bernstein is inducted.

See also 

 Chronology of poker

References 

1983 in poker